Seth Williams (born April 10, 2000) is an American football wide receiver for the Jacksonville Jaguars of the National Football League (NFL). He played college football at Auburn.

Early years
Williams attended Paul W. Bryant High School in Tuscaloosa, Alabama. He committed to Auburn University over his hometown University of Alabama to play college football.

College career
As a freshman at Auburn in 2018, Williams had 26 receptions for 534 yards and five touchdowns. He became Auburn's number one receiver his sophomore year in 2019. As a sophomore Williams recorded 59 receptions for 830 yards and eight touchdowns. As a junior in 2020, Williams recorded 
47 receptions for 760 yards and four touchdowns. Following his junior season Williams declared for the 2021 NFL Draft.

Professional career

Denver Broncos
Williams was drafted in the sixth round, 219th overall, of the 2021 NFL Draft by the Denver Broncos. On May 12, 2021, Williams officially signed with the Broncos. He was waived on August 31, 2021, and re-signed to the practice squad the next day. On January 2, 2022, Williams made his NFL debut in the team's week 17 game against the Los Angeles Chargers. Williams recorded his first career catch on a 34-yard pass from Drew Lock in the 34-13 loss. He was promoted to the active roster on January 3. Williams was waived by the Broncos on August 30, 2022.

Jacksonville Jaguars
On September 2, 2022, Williams was signed to the Jacksonville Jaguars practice squad. He signed a reserve/future contract on January 23, 2023.

References

External links
Jacksonville Jaguars bio
Auburn Tigers bio

2000 births
Living people
People from Tuscaloosa County, Alabama
Players of American football from Alabama
American football wide receivers
Auburn Tigers football players
Denver Broncos players
Jacksonville Jaguars players